The Curator Aquarum was a Roman official responsible for managing Rome's water supply and distributing free grain. Curators were appointed by the emperor. The first curator was Agrippa. Another notable Curator Aquarum was Frontinus, a Roman engineer.

History 

Before the Curator Aquarum Censors managed the water supply. Emperor Augustus, as part of another initiative to develop new positions, created the Curator Aquarum. The purpose of this new position was to maintain the water supply of Rome. Augustus appointed Agrippa as the Curator Aquarum. Aggripa was curator from 33 to 12 BC. He used a slave force consisting of 240 imperial slaves and 40 freedmen. During his term, he built the Aqua Julia, repaired existing aqueducts, and established the Cura Aquarum. After the death of Agrippa, Messala Corvinus became the Curator Aquarum. Emperor Claudius increased the number of the staff to 460 men. Eventually this would increase to 700 men. Frontinus was also appointed as the Curator Aquarum by emperor Nerva. During the 2nd Century the Curator Aquarum largely escaped the historical record. However, during the reigns of Septimius Severus and Caracalla a new position called Curator Aquarum et Minuciae was established. Lucius Novius Rufius, who was the Governor of Hispania Citerior and a supporter of Clodius Albinus, a rival of Septimius Severus, held the position of Curator Aquarum et Minuciae.

Roles and Powers 

The Curator Aquarum was generally a prominent Senator of Consular rank. Officially, they were chosen by the Senate, although unofficially the emperor always installed them. Curatores Aquarum, and their two Senatorial adiutores, or assistants, held mostly ceremonial power. They were officially given complete control over the Roman water supply and aqueducts. Despite this, no technical knowledge was expected of the curator, they were not even present in Rome for much of their term. The curator's subordinates were workers with knowledge of hydraulics such as engineers, pavers, plasterers, and aquarii. These workers would usually make all the decisions. Although the curator still managed the salary of these workers. Curatores Aquarum had the responsibility of ensuring a constant stream of water, they could have been called to clear aqueducts, they would have, fined offenders against the Aqueducts, they managed the trials of people who committed crimes against aqueducts or sewers, they would have managed the construction of new buildings and public works, and they could set up new Castella for water grants. Also, epistulas would have to be presented to the Curator Aquarum in order to gain access to the city's water. The curator would pass the letter onto the procurator, who would implement the request. In Ancient Rome, free grain would be distributed to the plebians at the Campus Martius which was by the Porticus Mincuia. It is possible that the Curator Aquarum was responsible for the distribution. However, the Curator Aquarum may have been responsible for using water to power a mill which made the grain. Other scholars contest this point of view. As the Aqua Traiana was created after the first Curatores Aquarum et Minuciae was elected. Curatores Aquarum had the right to travel with two Lictors, but only whilst outside the city of Rome. Curatores Aquarum were entitled to the toga praetexta and the sella curulis.

Procurates Aquarum 
Procurates Aquarum, were Roman procurators that managed the water supply. These procurator's names appear on many inscriptions in the sub cura formula, indicating an official role. However, there are a large quantity of these names. Indicating that they could not all have been procurators. Most likely, they were officials responsible for supervising public works involving the installation of a water conduit.

List of Known People who have been Curator Aquarum

References 

Lists of office-holders in ancient Rome